Frank Myers Field at Tointon Family Stadium is a baseball stadium in Manhattan, Kansas.  It is the home field of the Kansas State University Wildcats college baseball team.  The stadium's official capacity is 2,331 and opened for baseball in 1961. It is named after Bob and Betty Tointon, the principle benefactors for 2002 renovation project.

Construction 

Tointon Family Stadium opened as KSU Baseball Stadium in 1961, with a capacity of 1,500. It would be built around the existing diamond, now called Frank Myers Field.

After the stadium's completion the field was dedicated on April 7, 1961, in honor of Frank Myers, K-State's baseball coach who retired the following year. It would be another 24 years until the team could play night games after lights were installed in 1985.

Renovations 
In 2002, on its 41st anniversary, KSU Stadium saw the completion of its first significant renovation.  The $3.1 million project ended with the dedication on April 20, 2002, named in honor of Betty and Bob Tointon (Class of 1955).

New features included:
 State-of-the-art drainage and irrigation systems
 New home and visiting dugouts
 New seating for over 2,000 fans with 118 in the suites
 FieldTurf on the entire infield
  locker room
 33 custom-built wood lockers
 Bathrooms
 Shower Facilities
 Team Common Room
 New administration offices and facilities
During the summer of 2011, the entire playing surface was upgraded to AstroTurf GameDay Grass 3D.

The stadium is lined with the limestone donated by the Bayer Stone Company of St. Marys to match main campus buildings, including Anderson Hall.  In 2003 a state-of-the-art lighting system, electronic scoreboard, improved warning track and permanent ticket booth were added, followed two years later by new batting cages.

In 2020, Tointon Family Stadium completed a $15 million 2-year refurbishment to the facility in conjunction with the neighboring Busser Family Park, home for K-State Women's Soccer. This project brought improvements to the playing field and bullpens, expanded premium seating options on the club level, and upgrades to the clubhouse, new offices, and various other improvements. Expanded fan amenities were installed during the project including a permanent team merchandise store, a playground for young fans and families, and a new 44'x36' videoboard was installed beyond right field and is the first in the stadium's history. The exterior of the facility received a face lift with a new limestone façade to match the theme of other Athletic and Campus facilities. Improvements were also made to the Brandeberry Indoor Practice Facility, one of the few indoor baseball practice facilities in the nation which includes two batting cages, portable pitching mounds, and weight training and conditioning equipment.

Attendance
In 2013, the Wildcats ranked 46th among Division I baseball programs in attendance, averaging 1,369 per home game.

Historical notes
 The current 8-pole lighting system produces three times the illumination as the former system.

See also
 List of NCAA Division I baseball venues

References

College baseball venues in the United States
Baseball venues in Kansas
Kansas State University buildings
Kansas State Wildcats baseball
Sports venues completed in 1961
1961 establishments in Kansas
University and college buildings completed in 1961